The Quito School (Escuela Quiteña) is a Latin American artistic tradition that constitutes essentially the whole of the professional artistic output developed in the territory of the Royal Audience of Quito – from Pasto and Popayán in the north to Piura and Cajamarca in the south – during the Spanish colonial period (1542–1824). It is especially associated with the 17th and 18th centuries and was almost exclusively focused on the religious art of the Catholic Church in the country. Characterized by a mastery of the realistic and by the degree to which indigenous beliefs and artistic traditions are evident, these productions were among of the most important activities in the economy of the Royal Audience of Quito. Such was the prestige of the movement even in Europe that it was said that King Carlos III of Spain (1716–1788), referring to one of its sculptors in particular, opined: "I am not concerned that Italy has Michelangelo; in my colonies of America I have the master Caspicara".

Origins
The Quito School originated in the school of Artes y Oficios, founded in 1552 by the Franciscan priest Jodoco Ricke, who together with Friar Pedro Bedón transformed the San Andrés seminary, where the first indigenous artists were trained. As a cultural expression, it is the result of a long process of acculturation between indigenous peoples and Europeans, and it is one of the richest expressions of miscegenation (mestizaje) and of syncretism, in which the participation of the vanquished Indian is seemingly of minor importance as compared to the dominant European contribution.

Characteristics
As a product of cultural syncretism and miscegenation, the works of the Quito School are characterized by the combination and adaptation of European and Indigenous features. In its development, it reflected the styles prevailing in each period of Spain and thus contains renaissance and mannerist elements. During its height, it was eminently baroque, concluding with a short rococo period leading to an incipient neoclassicism until the transition to the republican period. The Quito School also incorporated Flemish, Italian, and Moorish influences.

One of the common characteristics of the school is the technique of encarnado ("flesh-colored") — the simulation of the color of the flesh of the (European) human body — that makes the skin of sculptures appear more natural. Once the piece was perfectly cut and sanded, an artisan covered the wood with several layers of gesso with glue. Each layer was highly polished to achieve a perfectly smooth finish. Next, color was applied in various transparent layers, allowing an optical mix of overlapping colors. This began with the colors of shadows (blue, green, ocher), then light colors were applied (white, pink, yellow). and finally highlight colors were added (orange and red to cheeks, knees, and elbows of children; and dark blue, green, and violet for wounds and bruises of Christ or for stubble on a beardless figure).

Other typical characteristics include:
Serpentine representation of the movement of bodies, especially in sculpture
Application of aguada (watercolor) on top of gold leaf or silver paint, giving a special metallic sheen

The features indicating its indigenous roots include:
 "Quiteñization" of characters, with mixed traits and local costumes
 Frequent appearance of ancestral indigenous customs
 Location of the scenes within the Andean countryside or cities
 Presence of local flora and fauna, and the substitution of local plants for traditional European iconography

Notable artists

Painters
Vicente Albán
Friar Pedro Bedón
Nicolás Javier Goríbar
Hernando de la Cruz
Miguel de Santiago (ca. 1620s-1706)
Manuel de Samaniego
Isabel de Santiago
Friar Pedro Gosseal

Sculptors
Bernardo de Legarda (ca. 1700—1 June 1773)
Manuel Chili (Caspicara)
Miguel Angel Tejada Zambrano
María Estefanía Dávalos y Maldonado

See also
Virgin of Quito
Baroque

References

External links
The colonial Andes: tapestries and silverwork, 1530-1830, an exhibition catalog from The Metropolitan Museum of Art Libraries (fully available online as PDF), which contains material on the Quito School

Ecuadorian art
Baroque painting
Rococo art
Spanish art
Spanish Baroque
Viceroyalty of Peru